Nasser Al Qudwa, also spelled Nasser Al-Kidwa, (born 1953), is the nephew of the late Yasser Arafat.

Early life and education
Al Qudwa was born in 1953. He attended Cairo University, graduating with a degree in dentistry in 1979. Then became an executive member of the Palestinian Red Crescent shortly after.

Career
Al Qudwa joined Fatah in 1969. He became president of the General Union of Palestinian Students in 1974. He is also a central-committee member of Fatah.

Qudwa represented his uncle Yasser Arafat and the Palestine Liberation Organization as an unofficial observer in the United Nations in 1987, then as a permanent observer in 1991. In 2005, he was succeeded by Riyad H. Mansour, when he became Foreign Affairs Minister in the Palestinian Authority Government of February 2005. Nasser served as United Nations Deputy Special Representative of the Secretary-General for Afghanistan in the United Nations Assistance Mission in Afghanistan (UNAMA). Al Qudwa was appointed deputy to Kofi Annan, then special envoy to Syria for the U.N. and Arab League in March 2012. He was responsible for the contacts with Syrian opposition groups. In 2014, Al Qudwa resigned from his position as U.N. Deputy Mediator on Syria.

Personal life
A current resident of New York City, al-Qudwa is the head of the Yasser Arafat Foundation.

See also

Foreign Affairs Minister of the Palestinian National Authority
Foreign relations of Palestine

References

External links
  by Leon Charney on The Leon Charney Report
 

1953 births
Living people
Foreign ministers of the Palestinian National Authority
Palestinian diplomats
Fatah members
Permanent Observers of Palestine to the United Nations
Central Committee of Fatah members